De Toppers, also known internationally as the Toppers, is a Dutch supergroup, consisting of René Froger, Gerard Joling, Jeroen van der Boom and Jan Smit. Gordon Heuckeroth, one of the founding members, left the group in 2011. The group has performed a series of concerts every year since 2005 in the Johan Cruyff Arena. Their repertoire consists mainly of a mix of covers and original material. Toppers in Concert, with more than 40 sold-out shows, is the longest running concert series in the Benelux. In 2008, the Toppers were selected to represent the Netherlands in the Eurovision Song Contest 2009 held in Moscow, Russia, with the song "Shine". They failed to qualify for the final.

History 

Gerard Joling and Gordon Heuckeroth formed as a guest band in a Rene Froger concert, which turned into a successful concert series. In 2005, the first two concerts were held at the Johan Cruyff Arena. In 2008, Joling left the Toppers and was replaced by Jeroen van der Boom. In 2010, Joling re-joined the group. They performed as a quartet before Heuckeroth departed in 2011.

In September 2016, Jan Smit stated he was interested in joining the group. A few hours later, van der Boom posted a video on Facebook of himself and Joling "auditioning" to join the band. Smit's addition was formally announced on February 21, 2017.

In 2017, the Toppers received a Special Achievement Award, selling more than 1.5 million copies of Toppers in Concert (CD + DVD). During the 2018 edition, they broke the world record in Canon Singing with 198.000 spectators during three concerts.

Toppers in Concert 

Toppers in Concert is an annual Dutch concert series by the Toppers, held in the Johan Cruyff Arena since 2005. Toppers in Concert is the longest running concert series in the Benelux. At the tenth edition in 2014, De Toppers welcomed their two millionth concert visitor. In 2016, the Toppers presented their first Christmas edition of Toppers in Concert in Rotterdam Ahoy.

Members

Concerts

Work

Albums 

|-
|align="left"|Toppers in concert||02-07-2005||09-07-2005||3||39|| Platinum
|-
|align="left"|Toppers in concert 2006||30-06-2006||08-07-2006||2||26|| Platinum
|-
|align="left"|Kerst met De Toppers||2006||-|||||| 10× Platinum
|-
|align="left"|Toppers in concert 2007||11-07-2007||21-07-2007||1(1wk)||19|| Platinum
|-
|align="left"|Toppers in concert 2008||01-08-2008||09-08-2008||2||17|| Platinum
|-
|align="left"|Toppers in concert 2009||28-08-2009||05-09-2009||4||10|| Platinum
|-
|align="left"|Toppers in concert 2010||20-08-2010||21-08-2010||2||17||  Platinum
|-
|align="left"|Mega party mix - Volume 1||20-05-2011||28-05-2011||7||13|| 
|-
|align="left"|Toppers in concert 2011||02-09-2011||10-09-2011||1(1wk)||23|| Platinum
|-
|align="left"|Mega party mix - Volume 2||09-03-2012||17-03-2012||19||9|| 
|-
|align="left"|Toppers in concert 2012||07-09-2012||15-09-2012||2||24|| 3-CD, Platinum
|-
|align="left"|Toppers in concert 2013||05-10-2013||12-10-2013||19||14|| Platinum
|-
|align="left"|Toppers in concert 2014||22-08-2014||30-08-2014||2||25|| 3-CD, Gold
|-
|align="left"|Toppers in concert 2015||28-08-2015||05-09-2015||1(2wk)||20|| 3-CD, Gold
|-
|align="left"|Toppers in concert 2016||26-08-2016||03-09-2016||3||10*|| 3-CD
|}

Singles 

|-
|align="left"|Live at the ArenA||2004||04-12-2004||5||8|| No. 3 in the Single Top 100
|-
|align="left"|Over de top!||12-04-2005||30-04-2005||22||5|| No. 6 in the Single Top 100
|-
|align="left"|Toppers party!||2005||16-07-2005||tip5||-|| No. 32 in the Single Top 100
|-
|align="left"|Wir sind die Holländer||2006||03-06-2006||18||5|| as "Toppers voor Oranje" /No. 7 in the Single Top 100
|-
|align="left"|Can you feel it?||11-06-2007||16-06-2007||8||5|| with John Marks /No. 10 in the Single Top 100
|-
|align="left"|Shine||16-02-2009||07-03-2009||15||8|| No. 2 in the Single Top 100 
|-
|align="left"|1001 Nacht||05-04-2013||20-04-2013||tip9||-|| No. 13 in the Single Top 100
|}

DVDs 
 Toppers In Concert 2005 -  Gold / Platinum
 Toppers In Concert 2006 -  Gold / Platinum
 Toppers In Concert 2007 -  Gold / Platinum
 Toppers In Concert 2008 -  Gold / Platinum
 Toppers In Concert 2009 -  Gold / Platinum
 Toppers In Concert 2010 -  Gold / Platinum
 Toppers In Concert 2011 -  Gold / Platinum
 Toppers In Concert 2012 -  Gold / Platinum
 Toppers In Concert 2013 -  Gold / Platinum
 Toppers In Concert 2014 -  Gold
 Toppers In Concert 2015 -  Gold 
 Toppers In Concert 2016 -  Platinum

Filmography 
 Froger, Joling & Gordon: Over de Toppers - Reality television
 Toppers in de Sneeuw - Reality television
 Kerst met De Toppers in Disneyland - TV Special
 Toppers: De weg naar de ArenA - Reality television
 Toppers: De weg naar de ArenA 2007 - Reality television
 Toppers op weg naar Moskou - Reality television
 Goede tijden, slechte tijden - Cameo appearance
 Nationaal Songfestival (2009) 
 Eurovision Song Contest 2009
 Wie wordt de 5e Topper? - Talentshow
 Toppers Halftimeshow - Talentshow
 Toppers Meezingmarathon - Toppers Marathon Series
 12,5 Jaar De Toppers - Reality television
 De Toppers: Wild West, Thuis Best - Reality television
 Topper Gezocht! - Talentshow

References

External links

Toppers in concert

Eurovision Song Contest entrants for the Netherlands
Eurovision Song Contest entrants of 2009
Musical groups from Amsterdam
Dutch disco groups
Pop music supergroups